Robert Dean may refer to:

Arts and Entertainment
 Robert George Dean (died 1989), American author of detective fiction
 Robert Dean Smith (born 1958), American tenor
 Rob Dean (born 1955), British musician

Politics
 Robert Dean (Australian politician) (born 1952), former member of the Victorian Legislative Assembly
 Robert Dean (Canadian politician) (1927–2021), Canadian politician
 Robert Dean (Michigan politician) (born 1954), American politician from the state of Michigan
 Robert P. Dean (1909–1984), Maryland politician
 Robert William Dean (1920–2014), American diplomat
 Robert W. Dean (1923–1999), Wisconsin jurist and legislator

Sports
 Robert Dean (baseball) (1915–?), Negro league baseball player
 Robert Dean (footballer) (born 1950), Australian rules player
 Robert Dean (handballer) (born 1955), American Olympic handball player
 Bob Dean (1929–2007), Canadian Football League kicker
 Bobby Dean (baseball), Negro league baseball player

Others
 Robert Dean (ufologist) (1929–2018), American UFOlogist

See also
 Robert Deane (disambiguation)
 Robert Deans (disambiguation)
 
 Dean Roberts (born 1975), New Zealand musician
 Bobby Deen (born 1970), American chef and businessman